Myxine circifrons, the whiteface hagfish, is a marine bathydemersal species of fish in the family Myxinidae. It is found off Southern California, Peru, and Chile and grows to  total length.

Distribution and habitat 

Anatomy and appearance 
It grows to  total length and is similar in appearance to other hagfish. Gonads are situated in the peritoneal cavity.

Reproduction 
The whiteface hagfish becomes male when the posterior part of the gonads develop and female if the anterior part develops. If both develop, the fish becomes hemaphroditic, and if none develops, the fish becomes sterile.

References 

Myxinidae
Fish described in 1899
Taxa named by Samuel Garman